Steven Lammertink (born 4 December 1993) is a Dutch former professional racing cyclist, who competed professionally between 2012 and 2019 for the , ,  and  teams. He rode at the 2013 UCI Road World Championships, and his older brother Maurits Lammertink is also a cyclist.

Major results

2011
 3rd  Road race, UCI Junior Road World Championships
 3rd Road race, National Junior Road Championships
 10th Overall Trofeo Karlsberg
2013
 2nd Omloop der Kempen
 4th Overall Tour de Berlin
2014
 1st  Time trial, National Under-23 Road Championships
 4th Time trial, UEC European Under-23 Road Championships
 9th Overall Tour de Gironde
2015
 1st  Time trial, UEC European Under-23 Road Championships
 1st  Time trial, National Under-23 Road Championships
 1st  Overall Tour de Berlin
1st Stage 2 (ITT)
 1st Stage 3 Le Triptyque des Monts et Châteaux
 7th Liège–Bastogne–Liège Espoirs
 8th Chrono Champenois
2016
 4th Time trial, National Road Championships
2018
 5th Chrono Champenois

References

External links
 
 
 

1993 births
Living people
Dutch male cyclists
People from Wierden
UCI Road World Championships cyclists for the Netherlands
20th-century Dutch people
21st-century Dutch people
Cyclists from Overijssel